"Praise to the Man" (originally titled "Joseph Smith") is a poem written as a eulogy in verse for Joseph Smith. The poem's authorship is typically attributed to Latter Day Saint leader and hymn writer William W. Phelps. The poem was composed soon after Smith's death, and was later set to music and adopted as a hymn of the Church of Jesus Christ of Latter-day Saints (LDS Church). It was first published with no directly attached name in the church newspaper Times and Seasons in August 1844, approximately one month after Smith was killed. The hymn is still used in the LDS Church, as number 27 in its current hymnal.

Origin
Phelps, the hymn's author, became involved in the Church of Christ, the original name of the church founded by Smith, during its time in Kirtland, Ohio.  He subsequently served as a leader in Missouri before leaving the church due to unresolved financial issues and personal dissatisfaction.  Declaring himself an enemy to the Mormon prophet, Phelps offered to testify against Smith in an intended Missouri trial for treason in which Smith would be the main defendant. However, the proceeding never took place, and in 1839 Smith and his associates were allowed to escape to the newly established Mormon haven of Nauvoo, Illinois.  

Two years later, Phelps experienced a change of heart toward Smith, and wrote him a repentant letter asking for forgiveness and a chance to rejoin the Latter Day Saints in Illinois. Smith's reply offered Phelps his full forgiveness and a return to the church with no further consequences. Phelps was deeply touched by this development, and upon his return he became an enthusiastic and devoted disciple of Smith's. Phelps was invited to speak at Smith's funeral in June 1844. His poem, "Joseph Smith", followed in August of that same year, and has since become a popular hymn.

Authorship Controversy
From the poem's initial publishing of the August 1, 1844 edition of the Times and Seasons until 1863, its authorship was consistently attributed to Eliza R. Snow. This changed upon the publishing of the 1863 edition of the Manchester Hymnal and has been perpetuated in subsequent LDS hymnals. The unclear authorship was likely due to Snow's byline appearing above two separate poems on the page and Phelps being both an assistant editor of the periodical as well as an accomplished poet.

Changes
Part of the original text of the second verse read: "Long shall his blood, which was shed by assassins, / Stain Illinois, while the earth lauds his fame." In 1927, in accordance with its "good neighbor" policy, the LDS Church officially changed the words "Stain Illinois" to "Plead unto heav'n".

Tune
Phelps originally suggested "Star in the East" as the hymn tune, which is probably the same melody as "Star in the East" from Southern Harmony.

The LDS hymnal now uses a melody based on "Scotland the Brave" in honor of Phelps's Scottish heritage. The tune is modified to match the syllable count of the text.

References

External links

 "Praise to the Man": Text and music, churchofjesuschrist.org
 Free MP3 download

Works about Joseph Smith
Cultural depictions of Joseph Smith
Latter Day Saint hymns
Works published anonymously
Works originally published in Times and Seasons
Songs with lyrics by W. W. Phelps (Mormon)
1844 poems
1844 in Christianity
Songs based on poems